Zeysky District is an administrative and municipal district (raion), one of the twenty in Amur Oblast, Russia. Its administrative center is the town of Zeya (which is not administratively a part of the district). Population:  20,827 (2002 Census);

Administrative and municipal status
Within the framework of administrative divisions, Zeysky District is one of the twenty in the oblast. The town of Zeya serves as its administrative center, despite being incorporated separately as an urban okrug—an administrative unit with the status equal to that of the districts.

As a municipal division, the district is incorporated as Zeysky Municipal District. Zeya Urban Okrug is incorporated separately from the district.

References

Notes

Sources



Districts of Amur Oblast